Pterostylis striata, commonly known as the mainland striped greenhood, is a species of orchid endemic to south-eastern mainland Australia. As with similar orchids, the flowering plants differ from those which are not flowering. The non-flowering plants have a rosette of leaves but the flowering plants have a single flower with leaves on the flowering spike. This greenhood has a white flower with prominent dark green stripes and a brown-tipped dorsal sepal with a thread-like tip. Mainland striped greenhoods were formerly described as Pterostylis alata but that species is now recognised as a Tasmanian endemic.

Description
The flowers are white with dark green stripes and a brownish tip. The dorsal sepal and petals are fused, forming a hood or "galea" over the column. Flowering occurs from May to August.

Taxonomy and naming
Pterostylis striata was first formally described in 1877 by Robert FitzGerald from a specimen found near Yass. Fitzgerald published the description in his book Australian Orchids. Plants in this species were formerly described as Pterostylis alata but that species is now recognised as a Tasmanian endemic. The State Herbarium of South Australia still lists Pterostylis alata as occurring in that state.

Distribution and habitat
The mainland striped greenhood grows in a range of habitats from tea-tree scrub to forest and is widespread in Victoria. In New South Wales it is found south from Orange.

References

striata
Endemic orchids of Australia
Orchids of New South Wales
Orchids of Victoria (Australia)
Plants described in 1877